The 2010 Hull City Council election took place on 6 May 2010 to elect members of Hull City Council in England. One third of the council was up for election and Liberal Democrats retained control of the council.

After the election, the composition of the council was
Liberal Democrat 33
Labour 22
Conservative 2
Independent 2

Ward results

No elections were held in Beverley, Kings Park and Newland wards.

Avenue

Boothferry

Bransholme East

Bransholme West

Two candidates elected.

Bricknell

Two candidates elected.

Derringham

Drypool

Holderness

Ings

Longhill

Marfleet

Myton

Newington

Orchard Park & Greenwood

Pickering

Southcoates East

Southcoates West

St Andrews

Sutton

University

References

2010 English local elections
May 2010 events in the United Kingdom
2010
2010s in Kingston upon Hull